Eyik (Eeyik) is a rural locality (a selo), the only inhabited locality, and the administrative center of Shologonsky National Rural Okrug of Olenyoksky District in the Sakha Republic, Russia, located  from Olenyok, the administrative center of the district. Its population as of the 2010 Census was 344, down from 346 recorded during the 2002 Census.

Geography
Eyik is located by the northern shore of lake Eyik in the eastern part of the Central Siberian Plateau. The source of the Tyukyan river is close to the village.

References

Notes

Sources
Official website of the Sakha Republic. Registry of the Administrative-Territorial Divisions of the Sakha Republic. Olenyoksky District. 

Rural localities in the Sakha Republic